Ralph Cornel Hancock (born November 16, 1951) is a professor of political science at Brigham Young University (BYU).

Biography
Hancock holds a BA from BYU and an MA and PhD from Harvard University, all in political science.  Before joining BYU's faculty Hancock was on the faculty at Hillsdale College and then at the University of Idaho.  He has also been a visiting professor at the University of Rennes.

Hancock has been a J. Reuben Clark fellow at BYU.  He has taught classes related to American and French political history and even more broadly related to the history of political thought.

Hancock edited America, the West and Liberal Education (Rowman and Littlefield, 1999) with essays by himself and such people as Allan Bloom and Stanley Rosen.  He also edited The Legacy of the French Revolution with Gary Lambert and wrote Calvin and the Foundations of Modern Politics (Cornell University Press, 1989).  He has also written articles for Square Two, Political Science Reviewer, FARMS Review and First Things among other publications.

Hancock and his wife Julie are the parents of five children.  Hancock has also been connected with the John Adams Center for the Study of Faith, Philosophy and Public Affairs.

Sources
BYU faculty profile for Hancock
Barnes and Noble listing of works by Hancock
Intercollegiate Studies Institute bio
An Invitation to Political Thought Author bios, p. xvii.

Brigham Young University alumni
Harvard University alumni
American political scientists
Hillsdale College faculty
Academic staff of the University of Rennes
University of Idaho faculty
Brigham Young University faculty
1951 births
Living people
American expatriates in France